USS E-1 (SS-24) was an E-class submarine of the United States Navy. Originally named Skipjack, the boat was launched on 27 May 1911 by the Fore River Shipyard, Quincy, Massachusetts; sponsored by Mrs. D. R. Battles; renamed E-1 on 17 November 1911; and commissioned on 14 February 1912, Lieutenant Chester W. Nimitz in command.  She was the first American submarine to be powered by diesel engines.

Service history
Six days after commissioning, E-1 sailed from Boston for Norfolk via Newport and New York. Off the Virginia Capes, she underwent tests through April. Her engines were overhauled at New London, and she began operations off southern New England. On 28 September, she arrived at New York Navy Yard for alterations, repairs, and installation of a Sperry gyrocompass, for which she became a pioneer underwater test ship. She also experimented with submerged radio transmission.

E-1 conducted tests of these and other important developments under the direction of Commander, Submarine Flotilla, Atlantic Fleet, Lieutenant (and future Fleet Admiral) Chester W. Nimitz. Throughout his career, Nimitz played a progressive and leading role in the incorporation into the Navy of the vast scientific and technological developments of this century, many of them pioneered by the Navy.  Nimitz's appreciation of the capabilities of submarines contributed to them becoming a decisive factor under his command in the War in the Pacific during World War II.

On 14 October E-1 proudly passed in review with the fleet in the North River before Secretary of the Navy George von L. Meyer.

E-1 continued important experimental development and training with the Atlantic Fleet for the next five years.  In 1916 she became the first American submarine to cross the Atlantic.  This was in response to the crossing of the Atlantic by the German submarines  and  earlier that year.

On 4 December 1917, when she left Newport for the Azores and different duty. From 12 January 1918, she patrolled between Ponta Delgada and Horta, protecting the islands from German attack and use as a haven by U-boats. She returned to New London on 17 September. After overhaul, E-1 trained new submariners and tested experimental listening gear.

Placed in commission in reserve on 20 March 1920, E-1 arrived at Norfolk on 22 April. There she was placed in commission in ordinary on 18 July 1921, and on 17 September sailed for Philadelphia, where she was decommissioned on 20 October and sold on 19 April 1922.

References

External links
 

E-1
E-1
Ships built in Quincy, Massachusetts
1911 ships